Albert Langereis (13 July 1888 – 13 January 1966) was a Dutch sports shooter. He competed in two events at the 1924 Summer Olympics.

References

External links
 

1888 births
1966 deaths
Dutch male sport shooters
Olympic shooters of the Netherlands
Shooters at the 1924 Summer Olympics
People from Opmeer
Sportspeople from North Holland